Jennifer Hirsch is a professor at the Mailman School of Public Health at Columbia University. She is the deputy chair for doctoral studies in the Department of Sociomedical Studies, and co-director of Columbia's Center for Population Research. Hirsch also co-directed the Sexual Health Initiative to Foster Transformation. Her work spans topics such as gender, human sexuality, and public health. Her book, A Courtship After Marriage: Sexuality and Love in Mexican Transnational Families, which has been used widely in college classrooms, explores the lives of Mexican women in Atlanta and rural Mexico, with a focus on changing ideas of marriage among Latinx couples. Hirsch served on the Board of Directors of Jews for Racial and Economic Justice from 2014-2020 (and as board chair from 2018-2020) and is a member of B'nai Jeshurun

Books

Authored or co-authored 
 Hirsch, Jennifer S. A Courtship After Marriage: Sexuality and Love in Mexican Transnational Families. Berkeley: University of California Press, 2003.
 Hirsch, Jennifer S., Daniel J. Smith, Holly Wardlow, Shanti Parikh, Harriet Phinney, and Constance A. Nathanson. 2009. The Secret: Love, Marriage, and HIV. Nashville, Vanderbilt University Press.
 Hirsch, Jennifer S., and Shamus Khan. 2020. Sexual Citizens: A Landmark Study of Sex, Power, and Assault on Campus. W. W. Norton & Company.

Edited or co-edited 
 Hirsch, Jennifer S. and Holly Wardlow. 2006. (Eds.): Modern Loves: The Anthropology of Romantic Courtship and Companionate Marriage. Ann Arbor: University of Michigan Press.  
 Padilla, Mark, Jennifer S. Hirsch, Robert Sember, Miguel Muñoz-Laboy and Richard Parker, eds. 2007. Love and Globalization: Transformations of Intimacy in the Contemporary World. Vanderbilt University Press.

Publications

Original peer reviewed articles 
   Hirsch, Jennifer S. and Nathanson, Constance A. 1998. "Demografía informal: cómo utilizar las redes sociales para construir una muestra etnográfica sistemática de mujeres mexicanas en ambos lados de la frontera." Estudios Demograficos y de Desarollo Urbano, Mexico, D.F; El Colegio de Mexico 12(1&2): 177–99.
   Hirsch, Jennifer S. 1999."En El Norte La Mujer Manda: Gender, Generation and Geography in a Mexican Transnational Community." American Behavioral Scientist. 42(9):1332-49.
   Hirsch, Jennifer S. and Constance A. Nathanson. 2001. Some Traditional Methods are More Modern than Others: Rhythm, Withdrawal and the Changing Meanings of Gender and Sexual Intimacy in the Mexican Companionate Marriage. Culture, Health & Sexuality. 3(4):413-28.
   Hirsch, J.S., Higgins J, Bentley M, and Nathanson C. 2002. The Cultural Constructions of Sexuality: Marital Infidelity and STD/HIV Risk in a Mexican Migrant Community. American Journal of Public Health, 92(8):1227-1237.
   Hirsch, Jennifer S. 2002. "'Que, pues, con el pinche NAFTA?: Gender, Power and Migration between Western Mexico and Atlanta." Urban Anthropology. 31(3-4): 351–87.
   Santelli, John, Roger Rochat, Kendra Hatfield-Timajchy, Brenda Colley Gilbert, Kathryn Curtis, Rebecca Cabral, Jennifer S Hirsch, Laura Schieve, and Other members of the Unintended Pregnancy Working Group. 2003. "The Measurement and Meaning of Unintended Pregnancy: A Review and Critique". Perspectives on Sexual and Reproductive Health 35(2):94-101.
   Hirsch, Jennifer S., Sergio Meneses, Brenda Thompson, Mirka Negroni, Blanca Pelcastre, and Carlos del Rio. 2007. The Inevitability of Infidelity: Sexual Reputation, Social Geographies, and Marital HIV Risk in Rural Mexico. American Journal of Public Health 97(6):986-96.
   Hirsch, Jennifer S., Richard G. Parker, and Peter Aggleton. 2007. Social Aspects of ART Scale-up: Introduction and Overview. AIDS 21 (suppl 5):S1-S4
   Hirsch, Jennifer S. 2007. Gender, Sexuality, and Anti-Retroviral Therapy: Using Social Science to Enhance Outcomes and Inform Secondary Prevention Strategies. AIDS 21 (suppl 5):S21-S29.
   Higgins, Jennifer, and Jennifer S. Hirsch. 2007. The Pleasure Deficit: Revisiting the Sexuality Connection in Reproductive Health. International Family Planning Perspectives. 33(3):133-9.
   Higgins, Jennifer, and Jennifer S. Hirsch. 2007. The Pleasure Deficit: Revisiting the Sexuality Connection in Reproductive Health. Perspectives in Sexual and Reproductive Health. 39(4):253-253.
   Markosyan, Karine M.; Babikian, Talin, DiClemente, Ralph J., Hirsch, Jennifer S., Grigoryan, Samvel), and del Rio, Carlos). 2007. Correlates of HIV risk and preventive behaviors in Armenian female sex workers. AIDS and Behavior Volume: 11 Issue: 2 Pages: 325-334 
   Sandfort, Theo G. M. Mark Orr, Jennifer S Hirsch, and John Santelli. 2008. Long-term health consequences of timing of sexual initiation: Results from a national U.S. Study. American Journal of Public Health 98:155-161.
   Higgins, Jennifer and Jennifer S. Hirsch. 2008. Pleasure and Power: Incorporating Sexuality, Agency and Inequality into Research on Contraceptive Use and Unintended Pregnancy. American Journal of Public Health 90(10): 1803–1813.
   Higgins, Jennifer, Jennifer S. Hirsch and James Trussell. 2008. Pleasure, Prophylaxis, and Procreation: A Qualitative Analysis of Intermittent Contraceptive use and Unintended Pregnancy. Perspectives on Sexual and Reproductive Health 40(3): 130–137.
   Hirsch, Jennifer S. 2008. 'Contracepting as Catholics': Anthropological perspectives on the study of religion's effect on fertility and contraceptive method preferences. Studies in Family Planning, 39 (2):93-104
   Hirsch, Jennifer S., Miguel Muñoz Laboy, Christina M. Nyhus, Kathryn M. Yount, and Jose Bauermeister. 2009. Because He Misses His Normal Life Back Home: Masculinity and Sexual Behavior among Mexican Migrants in Atlanta, Georgia. Perspectives in Sexual and Reproductive Health. 41(1):23-32 (NIHMS133864)
   Steward, Wayne T.; Remien, Robert H., Higgins, Jenny A.), Dubrow, Robert, Pinkerton, Steven D., Sikkema, Kathleen J, Truong, Hong-Ha M., Johnson, Mallory O., Hirsch, Jennifer, Brooks, Ronald A., Morin, Stephen F.. "Behavior Change Following Diagnosis with Acute/Early HIV Infection-A Move to Serosorting with Other HIV-Infected Individuals. The NIMH Multisite Acute HIV Infection Study: III" AIDS and Behavior Volume: 13 Issue: 6 Pages: 1054–1060 
   Miguel Muñoz Laboy, Jennifer S. Hirsch, and Arturo Quispe-Lazaro, A. 2009. Loneliness as a Sexual Risk Factor for Mexican Male Workers. American Journal of Public Health 99:802-810.
   Taylor, Barbara S, Garduno, L Sergio, Reyes, Emily V, Valino, Raziel, Rojas, Rita, Donastrong, Yeycy, Brudney, Karen, and Hirsch, Jennifer S. 2011. "HIV Care for Geographically Mobile Populations." Mount Sinai Journal of Medicine. 78(3): 342–51. 
   West BS, Hirsch JS, and El-Sadr W. 2012. HIV and H2O: Tracing the connections between gender, water and HIV, AIDS and Behavior. . 
   Nambiar, Devaki, Mai Huong Nguyen, Le Minh Giang, Jennifer Hirsch, and Richard G. Parker. 0. "Tabula Diptycha: Differential HIV Knowledge, Stigma and Intended Behavioural Outcomes Amongst Visitors at Vietnam's Pain and Hope Exhibition." Global Public Health 8 (S1):S46-60.
   Le Minh Giang, Jennifer S. Hirsch, Richard G. Parker and Emily E. Vasquez. 2013. Social and Policy Dimensions of HIV in Vietnam. 8(S1): S1-S6.
   Dao, Amy, Le Minh Giang, J. S. Hirsch, and R Parker. 2013. "Social Science Research of HIV in Vietnam: A Critical Review and Future Directions." Global Public Health 8 S1 (S7-S29)
   Vasquez, Emily, Hirsch, Jennifer, Giang, Le, and Parker, Richard. 2013. "Rethinking Health Research Capacity Strengthening." Global Public Health. 8 Suppl 1:S104-24.
   Phinney, Harriet M., Khuat Thu Hong, Vũ Thị Thanh Nhàn, Nguyễn Thị Phương Thảo, and Jennifer S. Hirsch. 2014. "Obstacles to the 'cleanliness of our race': HIV stigma, stratified reproduction, and population quality in Hanoi, Vietnam". Critical Public Health. 24(4):445-460. 
   Hirsch, Jennifer S. Labor migration, externalities and ethics: Theorizing the meso-level determinants of HIV vulnerability. 2014. Social Science and Medicine. 100: 38–45. . NIHMS #536685
  Taylor, Barbara S., Reyes, Emily V., Levine, Elizabeth A., Khan, Shah Z., Valino, Raziel, Garduno, L. Sergio, Donastorg, Yeycy, Brudney, Karen, Hirsch, Jennifer S. 2014. Patterns of Geographic Mobility Predict Structural Barriers to HIV Care in Mobile Populations. AIDS Patient Care and STDs. 28(6): 284-295
   Hirsch, Jennifer S., Giang, Le Minh, Parker, Richard G., and Duong, Le Bach. 2015. Caught in the Middle: The Contested Politics of HIV/AIDS and Health Policy in Vietnam. Journal of Health Care Politics, Policy and Law. 40(1):13-40.
   Elkington, Kate, Belmonte, K., Latack, J. A., Mellins, C. A., Wasserman, G. A., Donenberg, G. R., and Hirsch, J. S. (published on line 13 September 2014). "An exploration of family and juvenile justice systems to reduce youth HIV/STI risk" Journal of Research on Adolescence. 
   Hirsch, J.S. 2015. Desire Across Borders: Markets, Migration, and Marital HIV Risk in Rural Mexico. Culture, Health & Sexuality Volume 17 (S1):20-33
  Sommer, M, Hirsch, J, Nathanson, C, & Parker, R. 2015. Comfortably, safely and without shame: Defining menstrual hygiene management as a public health issue. American Journal of Public Health. 105(7):1302-11.
   Garcia J, Colson PW, Parker C, Hirsch JS. 2015. Passing the Baton: Process of using ethnographic methods to design a randomized clinical trial on the effectiveness of oral pre-exposure prophylaxis for HIV prevention among Black men who have sex with men. Contemporary Clinical Trials; 45(Pt B): 244–51.    
   Garcia J, Parker C, Parker RG, Wilson PA, Philbin MM, Hirsch JS. 2015. "You're Really Gonna Kick Us All Out?" Sustaining Safe Spaces for Community-Based HIV Prevention and Control among Black Men Who Have Sex with Men. PLoS ONE 10(10): e0141326.   .
   Garcia J, Parker RG, Parker C, Wilson PA, Philbin M, Hirsch JS. 2016. The limitations of 'Black MSM' as a category: Why gender, sexuality, and desire still matter for social and biomedical HIV prevention methods. Global Public Health. 11(7-8):1026-1048.  . 
   Garcia J, Parker C, Parker RG, Wilson PA, Philbin M, Hirsch JS. 2016 Psychosocial Implications of Homophobia and HIV Stigma in Social Support Networks: Insights for High-Impact HIV Prevention Among Black Men Who Have Sex With Men. Health Education & Behavior. 43(2):217-25. 1090198115599398. . . 
   Morgan Philbin, Caroline Parker, Richard Parker, Patrick Wilson, Jonathan Garcia, Jennifer Hirsch. N.d. (2016) The Promise of Pre-Exposure Prophylaxis for Black Men who Have Sex with Men: An ecological approach to Attitudes, Beliefs and Barriers. AIDS Patient Care and STDs. June 2016, 30(6): 282–290. .  
   Galeucia, Megan, and Jennifer S. Hirsch. 2016. State and Local Policies as a Structural and Modifiable Determinant of HIV Vulnerability Among Latino Migrants in the United States. American Journal of Public Health. 106(5): 800–807. 
   Caroline Parker, Jonathan Garcia, Morgan Philbin, Patrick Wilson, Richard G. Parker, Jennifer Hirsch. "Social risk, stigma and space: Key concepts for understanding HIV vulnerability among Black Men who have Sex Men in New York City", Culture, Health & Sexuality, (2017): 19:3, 323–337,  
   Hatzenbuehler, Mark L., Seth J. Prins, Morgan Flake, Morgan Philbin, M. Somjen Frazer, Daniel Hagen, and Jennifer S. Hirsch. 2017. Immigration Policies and Mental Health Morbidity Among Latinos: A state-level analysis. Social Science and Medicine. 174: 169-17

Non-peer reviewed publications 
   Hirsch, Jennifer. "The Facts: Teenage Pregnancy and Sexually Transmitted Diseases in Latin America." Washington, D.C: Center for Population Options, 1990.
   Hirsch, Jennifer. "The Facts: Teenage Pregnancy in Africa." Washington, D.C.: Center for Population Options, 1990.
   Hirsch, Jennifer. "The Facts: Young Women and AIDS: A Worldwide Perspective." Washington, D.C.: Center for Population Options, 1990.
   Hirsch, Jennifer. "Between the Missionaries' Position and the Missionary Position: Mexican Dirty Jokes and the Public (Sub)Version of Sexuality." Critical Matrix: Princeton Working Papers in Women's Studies. Volume 5:1-27, 1990.
   Barker, Gary, Jennifer Hirsch, and Shara Neidell. Serving the Future: an Update on Adolescent Pregnancy Prevention Programs in Developing Countries. Washington, D.C: Center for Population Options, 1991.
   Yinger, Nancy, Alex de Sherbinim, Luis H. Ochoa, Leo Morris and Jennifer Hirsch. La Actividad Sexual Y La Maternidad Entre Las Adolescentes en América Latina y El Caribe: Riesgos y Consecuencias. Washington, D.C.: Population Reference Bureau, Macro International, and the Centers for Disease Control, 1992.
   Jennifer Hirsch and Gary Barker. Abortion and Adolescents in the Developing World: A Preventable Tragedy. Washington, D.C.: Center for Population Options, 1992.
   Hirsch, Jennifer S. 'Because he misses his normal life back home': Masculinity, Sexuality and AIDS Risk Behavior in a Mexican Migrant Community. Migration World Magazine, Volume 29, No. 4, 2000.

Awards 
 Public Voices Fellow. Columbia University and the Op-Ed project. New York City, January – December 2015
 Gray Wawro Lecture on Gender, Health, and Wellbeing, Center for the Study of Women, Gender and Sexuality, Rice University, Houston, Texas, April 24, 2014
 Fellow, John Simon Guggenheim Memorial Foundation, 2012
 George and Mary Foster Distinguished Lecture in Cultural Anthropology, Southern Methodist University, Dallas Texas, April 13, 2011
 CHOICE Outstanding Academic Title of 2010 Award for "The Secret: Love, Marriage and HIV," 2010
 Honorable Mention, California Public Anthropology Competition for "Across Borders" (Book Proposal), 2009
 Outstanding Young Professional Award, Population, Family Planning and Reproductive Health Section, American Public Health Association, November 2002.
 Paul and Esther Harper Endowment Award, Department of Population Dynamics and Family Health Sciences, Johns Hopkins University, May 1999.
 Carl S. Schultz Award, Department of Population Dynamics, Johns Hopkins University,1997.
 Poster Award Winner, Population Association of America, Annual Meeting, Washington, DC, March 1997.
 Graduated summa cum laude and elected to membership in Phi Beta Kappa, Princeton University, June 1988.

References

External links 
 http://gender.stanford.edu/people/jennifer-hirsch
 http://gendersexualityhealth.org/people/jenniferhirsch.html
 
 

1967 births
Living people
Columbia University Mailman School of Public Health faculty
Princeton University alumni
21st-century American non-fiction writers
21st-century American women writers
American women non-fiction writers
American women academics